During the 1996–97 English football season, Stockport County F.C. competed in the Football League Second Division.

Season summary
The 1996–97 season proved to be possibly the most memorable in Stockport County's history. The season began in a forgettable fashion however, recording two draws and four defeats in the first six league matches. A 2nd round League Cup tie against Sheffield United proved to be a catalyst, and Stockport won with a 7–3 aggregate win, including a 5–2 victory at Bramall Lane. Although Stockport reached the northern final of the Auto Windscreens Shield, losing 2–0 on aggregate to Carlisle and just missing out on a visit to Wembley, it was the League Cup which provided the major highlights of the season, with four victories over top-flight opposition. The club, in its third colours for the first and only time in the season, recorded a 1–0 win away at Blackburn Rovers in the 3rd round, due to a colour clash with both the home and away kits. This win was followed by a 4th round 1–1 draw away to West Ham and a 2–1 victory in the replay at Edgeley Park, a quarter final 2–2 draw against Southampton at Edgeley Park followed by a 2–1 victory in the replay at The Dell, and then a semi-final meeting with Middlesbrough. Although County lost the first leg at Edgeley Park 2–0, they won 1–0 at the Riverside Stadium, failing to convert several chances to equalise on aggregate.

After a disappointing start, Stockport also enjoyed a great league campaign, eventually securing promotion from Division Two with a 1–0 victory at Chesterfield in the penultimate match of the season. Had Stockport failed to win the game they would have faced a deciding match away at promotion rivals Luton Town on the final day of the season. As it turned out, County travelled to Kenilworth Road with a chance to win the title, but a 1–1 draw meant that local rivals Bury finished top of the table with Stockport finishing second.

Final league table

Results
Stockport County's score comes first

Legend

Football League Second Division

FA Cup

League Cup

Football League Trophy

Squad

References

Stockport County F.C. seasons
Stockport County